The 2020 Cork Premier Senior Football Championship was the inaugural staging of the Cork Premier Senior Football Championship and the 132nd staging overall of a championship for the top-ranking Gaelic football teams in Cork. The draw for the group stage placings took place on 19 November 2019. The championship was scheduled to begin in April 2020, however, it was postponed indefinitely due to the impact of the COVID-19 pandemic on Gaelic games. The championship eventually began on 24 July 2020 and, after being suspended once again on 5 October 2020, and eventually ended on 29 August 2021.

Nemo Rangers were the defending champions.

The final was played on 29 August 2021 at Páirc Uí Chaoimh in Cork, between Castlehaven and Nemo Rangers, in what was their third final meeting and their first in six years. Nemo Rangers won the match by 3-07 to 0-13 to claim their 22nd championship title overall and a second title in succession.

Steven Sherlock from the St. Finbarr's club was the championship's top scorer with 3-36.

Format change

On 26 March 2019, three championship proposals were circulated to Cork club delegates. A core element running through all three proposals, put together by the Cork GAA games workgroup, was that there be a group stage of 12 teams, straight relegation, and one team from the divisions/colleges section to enter at the preliminary quarter-final stage. On 2 April 2019, a majority of 136 club delegates voted for Option A which would see one round of games played in April and two more in August – all with county players available.

Participating teams

Clubs

The club rankings were based on a championship performance 'points' system over the previous four seasons.

Divisions and colleges

Fixtures/results

Group 1

Table

Results

Group 2

Table

Results

Group 3

Table

Results

Divisional/colleges sections

Semi-finals

Final

Knock-out stage

Relegation playoff

Quarter-finals

Semi-finals

Final

Championship statistics

Top scorers

Overall

In a single game

Miscellaneous

 The quarter-final between Ballincollig and Nemo Rangers was postponed after it emerged that a Ballincollig player had tested positive for Covid-19 and a decision was made to temporarily suspend all club activity for 48 hours as a precautionary measure.

References

External link

 Cork GAA website

Cork Senior Football Championship
Cork
Cork Premier
Cork Championship